Viva Belarus! is a 2012 Polish drama film directed by Krzysztof Łukaszewicz about Belarusian Youth and its struggle for democracy. Based on a true story of Franak Viačorka, activist of the Belarusian opposition, co-author of the screenplay for the film.

Story 
Belarus has been under the dictatorship of Lukashenko for 16 years. Miron (23) is not interested in politics, he thinks his friends from the democratic opposition make just a bunch of daydreamers.  However, the "independent" rock group's next rock concert triggers public anti-regime demonstrations. Miron pays for these events by being forcibly drafted into the army despite his heart disease. In his unit, Miron comes face-to-face with inhumane conditions and indoctrination in the Soviet spirit. In protest, Miron, with the support of his beautiful and tireless girlfriend Vera, publishes blog ‘Life of a Conscript' on the Internet. The blog portrays the army as a miniature of contemporary Belarus, and its citizens as 'conscripts', subject to informal hierarchies and indoctrination, sparking a real storm in the Internet. Miron uses extracts from the blog in satirical songs which slam the regime and become street hits. The authorities decide to hit the rebel in his most sensitive spot...

Festivals and awards 
 11th Brussels Film Festival – Belgium – 19/26 June 2013 Prize Best Screenplay. 
 38° Gdynia Film Festival – Poland – 9/14 September 2013  Audience Award For The Best Film.
 3° Crime and Punishment Film Festival – Istanbul – Turkey – 9/16 sept 2013 First Prize 
 4. Military Film Festival – Warsaw – 16/21. September 2013 Best Feature Film, Golden Sable
 7. International Film festival for Young People – Austria – 3/5. October 2013 Prize of the Jury and Audience Award 
Febiofest – PRAGUE int. FF – Czech Republic -  14/22 March 2013 Official Selection
 Belarusian Days STOCKHOLM – Sweden – 19/21 March 2013
 Presentation at the European Parliament – October 15, 2013
 Molodist KIEV – 19/27 October 2013 
 Scanorama – Lithuania  -7/24 November 2013 Official Selection
 Camerimage - Poland -16/23 November 2013 Official Selection
 Goa Int Film festival – India -20/30 November 2013 Official Selection
 Tofifest - Poland - November 2013, Official Selection
 Polish festival Chicago- US - 8/26 November 2013 Official Selection
 Polish festival in Toronto – Canada – November 2013 Official Selection
 Noordelijk Festival – the Netherlands – 6/10 November 2013 Official Selection
 Camerimage Intl Film Festival of the Art of Cinematography – Poland - Nov 16-23 Official Selection

References

External links 
 
 «Viva Belarus!» at FilmPolski.pl
 «Viva Belarus!» at MultiKino.pl
 http://charter97.org/en/news/2013/9/9/75340/
 http://www.rferl.org/content/franak-viacorka-viva-belarus/24925295.html
 http://belarusdigest.com/story/free-%D1%81inema-unfree-belarus-14286
 http://www.kyivpost.com/content/russia-and-former-soviet-union/rferl-viva-belarus-awarded-for-best-screenplay-at-brussels-film-festival-326813.html
 http://artsfreedom.org/?p=4919

Polish drama films
2012 films
Films set in Belarus
Films about musical groups
Films about political repression